HyunJin (or HeeJin & HyunJin) is the second single album from South Korean girl group Loona's pre-debut project. It was released on November 18, 2016, by Blockberry Creative and distributed by CJ E&M. It introduces member Hyunjin and contains two tracks, her solo "Around You" and a duet between her and Heejin titled "I'll Be There". Music Videos for both songs were released simultaneously on November 18.

Track listing

Charts

References

2016 singles
Loona (group) albums
Single albums
Blockberry Creative singles